Virgilio Salimbeni (27 May 1922 – 30 October 2011) was an Italian racing cyclist. He won the Coppa Bernocchi in 1948 and Giro dell'Emilia in 1949, and rode the Tour de France in 1948, 1950 and 1951 and Giro d'Italia in 1948.

References

External links
 

1922 births
2011 deaths
Italian male cyclists
Cyclists from the Metropolitan City of Milan